Scuba Diving International (SDI) is a Scuba training and certification agency. It is the recreational arm of Technical Diving International, a technical diver training organization.

SDI is a member of the United States RSTC, the RSTC Canada and the RSTC Europe.

History
SCUBA Diving International, launched in 1998 or 1999, is the sister organization of Technical Diving International. SDI was created by dive professionals from the technical diving field. This gives the organization the perspective of teaching recreational diving through the lens of experienced technical diving.

SDI's philosophy is to improve recreational scuba diving training, enhancing older diving practices by incorporating new diving technology and emphasizing safety. The curriculum is set up to take divers from the beginner level to instructor level and structures its courses around a logged dive and specialty course approach. Divers who progress through SDI's recreational diving courses are then in a position to advance to technical diving with the courses offered by Technical Diving International.

Training

Whereas TDI and ERDI (the two sister companies of SDI) handle technical diving courses and emergency personnel courses respectively, SDI covers the recreational aspect of diving by offering the following courses:

SDI requires students to have access to a modern dive computer on all dives during training from the very start.

SDI is also unusual amongst recreational diver training organisations in that it recognises solo diving as part of recreational diving, and offers a special training course relating to it. Most major recreational diver training organisations mandate diving with a "buddy" at all times.

Entry Level Courses
These courses are meant for people interested in taking the first steps towards Scuba diving:

  - A course designed to provide children between the ages of 8 & 9 an introduction to scuba diving in a controlled environment under the direct supervision of an instructor. Once the future buddy turns 10 they can enroll in the SDI Junior Open Water Diver course. 
  - An introductory program to scuba diving, for people who are not sure they want to proceed with a full scuba course and certification. 
  - Entry-level certification to scuba diving
  - A skin diving course.

Specialty Courses
Advanced Diver Development Program - The aim of this program is for the diver to experience four different specialties to improve comfort level and skills in the water. To qualify as an advanced diver a minimum of 25 logged dives, which may include training dives, is required. These courses are for already certified divers, independent of their skill level, who wish to expand their knowledge of a specific area of interest:

 Advanced Adventure Diver
 Advanced Buoyancy
 Altitude Diver 
 Boat Diver
 Computer Diver
 Computer Nitrox Diver
 Deep Diver
 Diver Propulsion Vehicle
 Drift Diver
 Dry Suit Diver
 Equipment Specialist
 Inactive Diver Program
 Full Face Mask Diver Specialty
 Ice Diver
 Marine Ecosystems Awareness
 Night- Limited Visibility Diver
 Research Diver
 Search and Recovery
 Shore/Beach Diver
 Sidemount Diver
 Underwater Hunter & Collector
 Underwater Navigation
 Underwater Photography
 Underwater Video
 Visual Inspection Procedures
 Wreck Diver

Advanced Courses
These courses are for already certified divers, wishing to further progress on their certification level:

  - One of SDI's most popular courses, the solo diver program teaches experienced recreational divers how to safely dive independently of a dive buddy or strengthen your buddy team skills. This course so far is not offered by any other Underwater diving training organization. 
  - This course is designed for certified Advanced Divers to develop their knowledge and necessary skills to perform self rescues, buddy rescues and to assist and administer necessary first aid. (This is not a course for professional rescue divers. Such courses are offered by ERDI. A sister company of TDI and SDI)
  - This certification is awarded to certified Rescue Divers that have logged 50 dives.

Professional Courses
The courses below are considered professional courses as they allow the diver to engage in appropriate paid work:

 Divemaster Course
 Assistant Instructor Course
 Instructor Course
 Specialty Instructor
 Course Director Qualifications
 Instructor Trainer Qualifications
  - A program for Instructors who are current with another recognized scuba certification agency to crossover to Scuba Diving International.

EUF Certification
The SDI and the TDI training systems obtained CEN certification from the EUF certification body in 2006 with certificate number S EUF CB 2006002, and is currently certified until 2022.

Corporate affiliates
Scuba Diving International is one of the subsidiaries of  International Training whose group includes  Emergency Response Diving International, First Response Training International,  Performance Freediving International and Technical Diving International.

References

External links
 Scuba Diving International Official website

Underwater diving training organizations